Locke v. Davey, 540 U.S. 712 (2004), is a United States Supreme Court decision upholding the constitutionality of a Washington publicly funded scholarship program which excluded students pursuing a "degree in devotional theology." This case examined the "room ... between the two Religion Clauses", the Free Exercise Clause and the Establishment Clause.

Chief Justice William Rehnquist wrote the opinion of the court, with Justices Antonin Scalia and Clarence Thomas dissenting.

Background
Davey enrolled in Northwest College and received a Promise Scholarship. But when he declared a double major in pastoral ministries and business management/administration, his scholarship was revoked. Davey was given the opportunity to continue under the scholarship but without the pastoral ministries major, but he refused.

The scholarship
In 1999, the state of Washington legislature created a scholarship, the Promise Scholarship.  The scholarships were for $1,125 per year and were funded through the State's general fund. They were available for qualified students who enrolled for "at least half time in an eligible postsecondary institution in the state of Washington", but excluded study in theology.  This was because the Washington State Constitution specifically states that "No public money or property shall be appropriated for or applied to any religious worship, exercise or instruction."

The scholarship was available to any graduate of a Washington public or private high school. The student must be in the top 15%, receive a score of 1,200 or higher on the SAT, or score higher than a 27 on the American College Test. In addition, the student's family's income must be less than 135% of the median.

Holding
The statute was upheld.  The Court held that there was nothing "inherently constitutionally suspect" in the denial of funding for vocational religious instruction.  Even if there were, Washington had a "substantial state interest" in not funding "devotional degrees."

See also  	 
 List of United States Supreme Court cases, volume 540
 List of United States Supreme Court cases

References

Further reading

External links
 

Establishment Clause case law
United States free exercise of religion case law
United States Supreme Court cases
United States Supreme Court cases of the Rehnquist Court
2004 in United States case law
2004 in religion
American Civil Liberties Union litigation
Education in Washington (state)
History of Renton, Washington